Patturaikkal is a commercial and residential area in Thrissur city of Kerala. It is only 2 km from (Swaraj Round). Poonkunnam Siva Temple and Thiruvambady Sree Krishna temples are located near Patturaikkal. Patturaikkal is Ward 2 of Thrissur Municipal Corporation.

Buildings
Girija Theatre - This movie theater is at walkable distance from Patturaikkal.
Nalinam Auditorium - This is a marriage and conference auditorium having a seating capacity of 500.
 Ashwini Hospital 
 K.R. Bakes
 Sreelakshmi Silks
 Shree Bala Apartments
 Vadakethala Tower
 Vaidyamadom Ayurveda Vaidyasala
 Hatha Vidya Gurukulam Yoga institute - It is situated in Patturakkal junction
Thiruvambadi krishnan temple is also close to Patturaikkal.

ATMs:

State Bank (branch also)
Catholic Syrian Bank (branch also)
HDFC Bank 
Union Bank
South Indian Bank (Viyyur)
Dhanlaxmi Bank
Lakshmi Vilas Bank
ESAF small finance bank, (branch also 7593891155)

References

See also
Thrissur
Thrissur District
List of Thrissur Corporation wards

Suburbs of Thrissur city